John Douglas Roberts (20 November 1926 – 19 December 1965) was an Australian rules footballer who played with Richmond in the Victorian Football League (VFL).

Roberts struggled to gain a regular place in the Richmond senior side, but did win the Richmond Reserves’ Best and Fairest award in 1949. He subsequently coached country teams in Maffra, Rushworth and Donald.

He drowned at the age of 39 in Lake Buloke (just north of Donald) in December 1965.

Notes

External links 

1926 births
1965 deaths
Australian rules footballers from Victoria (Australia)
Richmond Football Club players
Traralgon Football Club players